The Jurassic Way is a designated and signed long-distance footpath that connects the Oxfordshire town of Banbury with the Lincolnshire town of Stamford in England. It largely follows an ancient ridgeway traversing Britain; most of its  route is in Northamptonshire on the Jurassic limestone ridge in the north of that county.

The trail goes near the Oxford and Grand Union canals, past the Great Central Railway's Catesby Tunnel and viaduct, the River Welland, the 82-arch viaduct at Harringworth, and Rockingham Castle.

It connects with these long-distance footpaths:
Grand Union Canal Walk,
Hereward Way,
Macmillan Ways,
Midshires Way,
Oxford Canal Walk.
The ancient trackway on which the Jurassic Way is based likely continued at each end, particularly following the Lincoln Cliff towards the River Humber.

References

External links 
Brief details from the Ramblers Association
Brief details from East Midlands Tourism
Further details
Brief details from Northamptonshire County Council
Walking on the Web page for The Jurassic Way 
 The Jurassic Way at geograph.org.uk

Footpaths in Leicestershire
Footpaths in Lincolnshire
Footpaths in Northamptonshire
Long-distance footpaths in England
South Kesteven District